The Laurentian Slope Seismic Zone is a seismically active area in Atlantic Canada located on the Grand Banks of Newfoundland. It was the epicenter of the magnitude 7.2 1929 Grand Banks earthquake. Since then, more than 20 relatively minor earthquakes have occurred.

References

Geology of Newfoundland and Labrador
Earthquakes in Newfoundland and Labrador
Seismic zones of Canada